The Deadman Hills are a low mountain range in the central Mojave Desert, in San Bernardino County, southern California.

The hills define the eastern side of Apple Valley, both the landform and community.

California State Route 18 passes through the southern end of the range en route to the Lucerne Valley to the east.

References 

Mountain ranges of the Mojave Desert
Mountain ranges of Southern California
Mountain ranges of San Bernardino County, California